Puzhakkattiri is a village in Malappuram district in the state of Kerala, India

Transportation
Puzhakkattiri village connects to other parts of India through NH966. It connects to Malappuram, Palakkad and Kozhikode district head quarters as well as other towns such as Perinthalmanna, Mannarkad, Kondotty etc.
The nearest airport is at Kozhikode. The nearest major railway stations are at Tirur, Angadippuram and Pattambi

References

   Villages in Malappuram district
Kuttippuram area